Maria Sofia De la Gardie (1627 – 22 August 1694)  was a Swedish noble, countess, courtier, banker and industrialist entrepreneur. She is most known for her industrial enterprises, and she has been referred to as the first female grand entrepreneur of her country. She served as överhovmästarinna to Queen Christina of Sweden.

Biography

Early life
Maria Sofia De la Gardie was born to count Jacob De la Gardie and Ebba Brahe. She was the sister of Magnus Gabriel De la Gardie, the favorite of Queen Christina, Queen of Sweden and the sister-in-law of Princess Countess Palatine Maria Eufrosyne of Zweibrücken, the cousin of the queen. She was born and raised in Swedish Estonia, where her father was governor of Reval.
In 1643, she married baron Gustaf Gabrielsson Oxenstierna (1613–1648), nephew of regent Axel Oxenstierna (1583–1654) who succeeded her father as governor of Estonia. As was the custom in 17th century Swedish nobility, she kept her own name also after marriage. Both her own family and the family of her spouse was extremely wealthy. During his absence, she managed his estates.

Life at court
After the death of her spouse in 1648, she became the guardian of her two underage daughters and responsible of the vast estates of the family. After the death of her father in 1652, she was given the responsibility of several estates also after him, making her one of the greater landowners in Sweden.

Maria Sofia was described as a great beauty, temperamental, forceful and talented, and could speak both French and German fluently.    She was close to her brother Magnus Gabriel, the favorite of the monarch, and it was possibly because of him that she was showered with gifts from the monarch.   She was given an allowance which helped her sort out her affairs, and her late spouse was posthumously granted the title of count, giving her the title and rank of precedence of countess at court.  In 1651, she was appointed head lady-in-waiting, first with the title  Court Mistress (Hovmastarinna)  but soon with the title  Chief Court Mistress (Overhovmastarinna), the highest office for a female at the royal court, though it was split on several people during the reign of Christina.   She often hosted the queen at her residence Tyresö Palace, were the monarch liked to hunt.

In 1649, there was reports of a possible marriage with the heir to the throne, future King Charles X of Sweden. The Danish ambassador reported about them in November that year. The plans was never realized, but the rumors continued until 1652. They were possibly staged by Queen Christina of Sweden as a way of avoiding the pressure of Christina to marry Charles. In reality, they are not considered to have been serious if they did occur. It is however known that she was proposed to by the Duke of Croy. Maria Sofia had many suitors but preferred to stay unmarried.

It is known that she passionately supported her brother when he fell from grace in 1653, but this does not seem to have affected neither his nor her own position. With some exceptions, such as Ebba Sparre, lady Jane Ruthven and Louise van der Nooth, Christina did not show any interest in her female courtiers, and generally mentions them only to express contempt over their femininity and portray herself as more masculine than them. After the abdication of Christina in 1654, Maria Sofia left court to devote her life to her industrial interests, for which she has become known in history.

Industrial activity
Maria Sofia De la Gardie resided in Tyresö Palace, from where she managed her estates around the Baltic Sea. On her brothers suggestion she made a study trip to the Netherlands, to study the industrial life. She was interested in cattlebreeding and gardening. She managed glovemaking and a brassmakery. Her most successful enterprise was a textile industry: by the energy of waterfalls on her estate, she manufactured the broadcloth and textiles which equipped to the army.

During the 1650s, De la Gardie engaged in banking activity and competed with her competitor, Stockholms Banco, by taking up large loans in the bank and then using the sums by lending it to the customers in her own bank: this was initially very lucrative, but eventually, problems enabled the Stockholms Banco to confiscate and sell her banking security. 

Maria Sofia De la Gardie took part in the pacification of Skåne by acquiring several estates there after it had been incorporated into Sweden in 1658. In 1667, she bought Krapperup Castle and managed a colliery for export. She built ships, exported timber and grain, founded papermills and fabricated linseed oil.

During the famous Katarina witch trials in 1676, the main witness Lisbeth Carlsdotter, inspired by the Gävle-Boy, tried to implicate her and her sister-in-law Maria Eufrosyne for witchcraft. This accusation was not taken seriously and never brought to trial, but rather, it damaged the credibility of the witness to such a point which eventually led to the end of the whole witch hunt.

At the Great Reduction of King Charles XI of Sweden in the 1680s, most of her and her brothers property was confiscated by the crown, something which affected her deeply. She died in 1694.

See also
 Margaretha Donner
 Margareta von Ascheberg

References

Other sources
 Marie Sophie De la Gardie, urn:sbl:17384, Svenskt biografiskt lexikon (art av B, BoiiTHius.), hämtad 2013-11-28.
 Ellen Fries: Svenska Kvinnor ['Swedish women'], utg av S.Björklund, (1920)  
 Jan Guillou: Häxornas försvarare ['Defender of the witches'] 
 Wilhelmina Stålberg: Anteckningar om svenska qvinnor ('Notes on Swedish women']

Further reading

External links

1627 births
1694 deaths
17th-century Swedish businesswomen
17th-century Swedish businesspeople
Swedish countesses
Mistresses of the Robes (Sweden)
Swedish bankers
Women bankers
Swedish people of French descent
People of the Swedish Empire
Swedish industrialists
Court of Christina, Queen of Sweden
Maria Sofia
17th-century women landowners
17th-century Swedish landowners